Team Ibis Cycles (UCI code: DPD) was an UCI elite women's cycling team based in the United Kingdom in 2012. The team was founded as a non UCI team in 2011 called Specialized-DPD Pakketservice. It competed in road bicycle racing events, including UCI Women's Road World Cup events. The title sponsor is an American bicycle brand.
The team announced at the end of 2012 that they would stop due to financial problems.

Team roster

2012  

Ages as of 1 January 2012.

2012 season 
Laura Trott became (as part of the British national team) two times Olympic Champion at the 2012 Summer Olympics (omnium, team pursuit), 2012 Omnium's World Champion and won the 2011–2012 UCI Track Cycling World Cup (team pursuit) and became 3rd in the omnium
 3rd Sparkassen Giro Bochum; Eileen Roe
 3rd Danish National Road Championships, road race; Julie Leth
 3rd Danish National Road Championships, time trial; Julie Leth

Results in major races

UCI World Ranking

The team finished 32nd in the 2012 UCI ranking for teams.

References

External links

Official website

UCI Women's Teams
Cycling teams based in the United Kingdom
Cycling teams established in 2011
Defunct cycling teams based in the United Kingdom
Cycling teams disestablished in 2012